Ernesto is a 1979 film directed by Salvatore Samperi and starring Martin Halm. The movie is loosely based on Umberto Saba's novel of the same name.

Plot
In Trieste, Austria-Hungary (Italy after the end of World War I) in 1911, Ernesto (Martin Halm) is a 17-year-old boy who lives with his widowed mother in the home of his violin-loving Jewish uncle and works in an office at a routine job. He espouses socialist views largely to cause his uncle distress. He discovers his homosexuality when he meets a stableboy (Michele Placido), who is not identified by name. They become infatuated with each other and have an intense sexual relationship, which develops against a realistic depiction of the social setting. Ernesto loses his job when his sexual behavior is discovered and reveals to his mother his same-sex relationship, which he continues to view as shameful. He is dishonest with his same-sex partner, and their relationship ends when Ernesto begins to visit a prostitute for sex.

Ernesto takes violin lessons where he meets 15-year-old Rachel and her twin brother Emilio, both depicted by the same actress (Lara Wendel). Both of the twins fall in love with Ernesto, who marries the sister, resolving his problems with his mother and uncle as well as his former employer. Having outgrown his years of spontaneity and exploration, Ernesto denies his sexual past when he encounters his first lover and refuses to recognize him.

Cast
Martin Halm as Ernesto
Michele Placido as The Man / The stableman
Virna Lisi as Ernesto's Mother
Turi Ferro as Carlo Wilder
Francisco Marsó as Uncle Giovanni
Conchita Velasco as Aunt Regina
Lara Wendel as Ilio/Rachele 
Gisela Hahn as Mrs. Luzzato
Renato Salvatori as Cesco
Stefano Madia as Andrea

Awards
The film was entered into the 29th Berlin International Film Festival, where Michele Placido won the Silver Bear for Best Actor.

References

External links

1979 films
1970s coming-of-age drama films
1979 LGBT-related films
Italian LGBT-related films
Italian coming-of-age drama films
West German films
Spanish drama films
1970s Italian-language films
Films directed by Salvatore Samperi
Films produced by Michael Fengler
Teen LGBT-related films
Films set in Italy
Films set in the 1910s
Films based on Italian novels
LGBT-related drama films
1979 drama films
1970s Italian films